Lawrenceville, New York may refer to:

Lawrenceville, a hamlet within Catskill (town), New York, in Greene County, New York
Lawrenceville, a hamlet within Lawrence, St. Lawrence County, New York, in St. Lawrence County, New York

Also: 
village of Lawrence, within Hempstead (town), New York, in Nassau County, New York